Jacob Olie (1834 – 1905) was a photographer from Amsterdam known for his scenes of everyday life there.

Olie was born in Amsterdam and was trained as a carpenter and draughtsman. He became a teacher at the local school for craftsmen known as the Ambachtsschool, converting it to be the first ever vocational school of the Netherlands for boys. He took up photography as a hobby. Today he is known for his unusually sharp depictions of various parts of Amsterdam that no longer exist. His son by the same name also became a photographer.

References 

 Amsterdam in de tweede helft der XIXe eeuw gezien door Jacob Olie Jacobsz, by Eeghen, I.H. van, Genootschap Amstelodamum, 1960

External links 

1834 births
1905 deaths
Photographers from Amsterdam
19th-century Dutch photographers